Christina Pitsillou (born 26 July 1995) is a Cypriot footballer who plays as a defender for First Division club AC Omonia and the Cyprus women's national team.

International career
Pitsillou capped for Cyprus at senior level on 27 February 2019 playing the first half of a 2–1 friendly win against Lithuania.

References

1995 births
Living people
Cypriot women's footballers
Cyprus women's international footballers
Women's association football defenders
Barcelona FA players